Ruth Janet Patten (b 1972) has been Archdeacon of Colchester since 2019.

Patten was educated at  the Roehampton Institute. She was ordained after a period of study at Westcott House Cambridge. Her first post was a curacy in Witham. She was Priest in charge at Great Dunmow  before her appointment as Archdeacon.

References

1972 births
Living people
Alumni of the University of Roehampton
21st-century English Anglican priests
Alumni of Westcott House, Cambridge
Archdeacons of Colchester